Thomas H. O'Brien (June 22, 1860 – April 21, 1921) was an infielder in Major League Baseball who played for five clubs in parts of six seasons between 1882 and 1890. O'Brien batted and threw right-handed. He was born in Salem, Massachusetts.

A valuable utility, O'Brien played at least one game in each position except shortstop, although he played mostly at second base and first base. He reached the majors in 1882 with the Worcester Ruby Legs (NL), spending one year with them before moving to the Baltimore Orioles (AA), 1883), Boston Reds (UA, 1884), again with Baltimore (1885), and the New York Metropolitans (AA, 1887) and Rochester Broncos (AA, 1890). His most productive season came in 1884 with Boston, when he appeared in 103 games while hitting .263 with four home runs, 118 hits, 31 doubles, eight triples and 80 runs scored –all career-numbers.

In 270 games, O'Brien was a .231 hitter (257-for-1111), including 74 extra-base hits and 61 RBI.

O'Brien died in Worcester, Massachusetts, at the age of 60.

External links
 Baseball Reference
 Retrosheet

1860 births
1921 deaths
Worcester Ruby Legs players
Baltimore Orioles (AA) players
Birmingham Barons managers
Boston Reds (UA) players
New York Metropolitans players
Rochester Broncos players
Major League Baseball second basemen
Major League Baseball first basemen
19th-century baseball players
Baseball players from Massachusetts
Sportspeople from Salem, Massachusetts
Memphis Reds players
Woonsocket (minor league baseball) players